Wadleigh State Park is a public recreation area located on the south shore of  Kezar Lake in Sutton, New Hampshire. The state park has a bathhouse and playing fields and offers opportunities for swimming, picnicking, fishing, and boating.

History
The park was developed by workers with the State Emergency Work Agency and the Civilian Conservation Corps after the land was given to the state by the Village Improvement Society, which had raised money to make its initial purchase through public subscription. The 1938 Hurricane destroyed much the park including recently constructed buildings and vast amounts of its forest.

Greenway
The park is on the Sunapee-Ragged-Kearsarge Greenway, a  loop trail that also passes Mount Sunapee State Park, Winslow State Park, Rollins State Park, Gile, Kearsarge and Shadow Hill state forests, and the Bog Mountain Wildlife Management Area.

Notes

References

External links
Wadleigh State Park New Hampshire Department of Natural and Cultural Resources
Sunapee Ragged Kearsarge Greenway Coalition

State parks of New Hampshire
Parks in Merrimack County, New Hampshire
Sutton, New Hampshire
Protected areas established in 1934
1934 establishments in New Hampshire
Civilian Conservation Corps in New Hampshire